Charles J. Jenkins (October 4, 1897 – December 8, 1954) was an American lawyer and politician.

Biography
Jenkins was born in Austin, Texas, and was an African American. In 1904, he moved to Chicago, Illinois, and graduated from Wendell Phillips Academy High School. He received his bachelor's degree from Bishop College in 1919 and his law degree from Chicago-Kent College of Law in 1922. Jenkins was admitted to the Illinois bar in 1922 and practiced law in Chicago. He served in the Illinois House of Representatives from 1931 until his death in 1954. He died at Presbyterian Hospital in Chicago, from an illness.

Notes

1897 births
1954 deaths
People from Austin, Texas
Politicians from Chicago
Lawyers from Chicago
African-American state legislators in Illinois
Bishop College alumni
Chicago-Kent College of Law alumni
Republican Party members of the Illinois House of Representatives
African-American lawyers
20th-century American lawyers
African-American men in politics